Lonsee is a town in the Alb-Donau district in Baden-Württemberg in Germany.
The population of Lonsee in 2019 is 5010; the town consists of 7 villages – Ettlenschieß, Halzhausen, Lonsee, Luizhausen, Radelstetten, Sinabronn, and Urspring. The village has a town hall, two railway stations on the Fils Valley Railway, and two schools. Various clubs and groups provide for an active social life. Lonsee was first mentioned in the year 888, but the remains of a Roman fort in nearby Urspring tell of an even older history. Lonsee has been twinned with the English town of Kingskerswell since 1989.

References

Alb-Donau-Kreis
Württemberg